Ebodina sinica is a species of moth of the family Tortricidae. It is found in China (Yunnan), northern Thailand and Vietnam.

References

Moths described in 1986
Polyorthini